Underwater Moonlight is the second studio album by English rock band the Soft Boys, released on 28 June 1980 by record label Armageddon.

Initially unsuccessful, the album has gone on to be viewed as a psychedelic classic, influential on the development of the neo-psychedelia music genre and on a number of bands, especially R.E.M. It is included in Robert Dimery's 1001 Albums You Must Hear Before You Die.

Recording 

The album was recorded between January and June 1980 at the Alaska and James Morgan studios in London, and during June 1979 at Spaceward Studios in Cambridge. The London sessions were produced by Pat Collier, while the Cambridge sessions were produced by Spaceward Studios staff. The recordings were done on 4- and 8-track, and only cost £600.

Release 

Underwater Moonlight was released 28 June 1980 by Armageddon Records.

The album was initially unsuccessful commercially, especially in the United Kingdom, where over half the sales were exports to America.

Reception 

Bill Holdship of Rolling Stone, in his 2001 review, wrote that the album "offers modern listeners some great, great rock songs". In his retrospective review, Stephen Thomas Erlewine, writing for AllMusic, felt that the music on the album showed the influence of the Beatles, the Byrds and Syd Barrett.

Legacy 

Whilst commercially unsuccessful originally, Underwater Moonlight has gone on to be viewed as a one-off psychedelic classic. Matt LeMay of Pitchfork, in a 2010 review, felt that the album was commercially unsuccessful because the timing was wrong: at the time of its release, audiences had little interest in "music that incorporated the indelible harmonies of the Byrds and the surrealism of Syd Barrett", but that anyhow the album is "best considered with the benefit of hindsight, and for all the famous music it inspired, there is still nothing quite like Underwater Moonlight". In 2001, Bill Holdship of Rolling Stone wrote that the album's influences could be detected "on bands ranging from R.E.M. and the Replacements to the Stone Roses and the Pixies". According to Stephen Thomas Erlewine of AllMusic, Underwater Moonlight "influenced the jangle pop of R.E.M. and other underground pop of the 1980s."

It is included in Robert Dimery's 1001 Albums You Must Hear Before You Die.

Track listing 

All the tracks on this disc were taken from rehearsal recordings.

Personnel 

Credits adapted from the 2001 Matador reissue liner notes.

 The Soft Boys

 Robyn Hitchcock – guitar, vocals, rhythm bass (5)
 Kimberley Rew – guitar, vocals, bass (7), synthesiser (7)
 Matthew Seligman – bass
 Morris Windsor – drums, vocals

 Additional personnel

 Gerry Hale – violin (5, 10)
 Andy King – sitar (3)

 Technical personnel

 Pat Collier – production (1–3, 5, 6, 8–10, 12–18), engineering (1, 8, 12–18)
 James Morgan – engineering (2, 3, 5, 6, 9, 10)
 Mike Kemp – production, engineering (4, 7, 11, 19)
 The Soft Boys – production (4, 7, 11, 19)

 Production notes

 Disc 1: tracks 4, 7, 11, 19 recorded June 1979 at Spaceward Studios, Cambridge; all other tracks, except track 14, recorded January–June 1980 at Alaska and James Morgan studios, London; track 14 recorded July 1980 at Alaska, London
 Disc 2: rehearsals taped on a boombox or recorded on a two-track machine at the Cambridge Rowing Club Boathouse, September 1979–July 1980

References

External links 

 Underwater Moonlight (Adobe Flash) at Radio3Net (streamed copy where licensed)
 

The Soft Boys albums
1980 albums
Psychedelic pop albums